Eunemobius is a genus of insect in family Gryllidae.

Taxonomy
The Orthoptera Species File database lists the following species:
Eunemobius carolinus  (Scudder, 1877)
Eunemobius confusus  (Blatchley, 1903)
Eunemobius melodius  (Thomas & Alexander, 1957)
Eunemobius trinitatis  (Scudder, 1896)

References

Ground crickets